House of Elders could refer to: 

 House of Elders (Afghanistan)
 House of Elders (Somaliland)

See also
 Elder (disambiguation)
 Eldership (disambiguation)
 Council of Elders (disambiguation)